Atamanovka is a rural locality (a khutor) and the administrative center of Atamanovskoye Rural Settlement, Danilovsky District, Volgograd Oblast, Russia. The population was 601 as of 2010. There are 7 streets.

Geography 
Atamanovka is located in steppe, on the left bank of the Beryozovka River, 42 km south of Danilovka (the district's administrative centre) by road. Rogachi is the nearest rural locality.

References 

Rural localities in Danilovsky District, Volgograd Oblast